Main Road Post is a Russian visual effects studio headquartered in Moscow, Russia. As of 2022 the studio has gained international reputation (which continued despite 2022 Russian invasion of Ukraine). The studio has worked on the visual effects for the largest-scale International films of the last decade.

It is best known for the visual effects of the film, Wanted,League of Legends, Stalingrad.

The studio was ranked 15th among the top 100 most influential animation studios.

Filmography

TV series

Games

References

External links

Visual effects companies